Madeline is an animated television series produced by DIC Entertainment, L.P., part of the Madeline media franchise about the character Madeline. It began as a series of six television specials from 1988 to 1991, and then continued as Madeline and The New Adventures of Madeline from 1993 to 2001. The show is narrated by famous celebrity voice talent Christopher Plummer.

Background 
In 1960, the Madeline stories were adapted to a one-hour color episode for the NBC series The Shirley Temple Show. Madeline was played by Gina Gillespie, child actor Michel Petit played Pepito, and Imogene Coca portrayed Miss Clavel. The episode, as Madeline's first appearance on television, has been released to DVD.

Characters 
 Madeline (Tracey Lee Smythe: season 1; Andrea Libman: seasons 2–3; Marsha Moreau: specials)
 Miss Clavel (Judith Orban: specials; Louise Vallance: seasons 1–3)
 Chloe (Anik Matern: specials; Vanessa King: seasons 1–2; Veronika Sztopa: season 3)
 Nicole (Kristin Fairlie: season 1; Veronika Sztopa: season 2; Britt Irvin: season 3; Sonja Ball: specials)
 Marie (Sonja Ball: seasons 1–2)
 Pepito (Julian Bailey: specials; A.J. Bond: season 1; David Morse: season 2; Michael Monroe Heyward: season 3; Kyle Labine)
 Genevieve (Louise Vallance: seasons 1–2)
 Danielle (Liz MacRae: specials; Kelly Sheridan: season 1; Tracey Lee Smythe: season 2; Chantal Strand: season 3)
 Lord Cucuface (French Tickner)
 Narrator (Christopher Plummer: specials; seasons 1–2; Christopher Gaze: season 3)

Character review
Madeline: The central protagonist of the show. She is a kind, caring, and brave little redheaded girl who is also the bravest of her group despite being short. She lives in a boarding school/orphanage with eleven other girls and their instructor, Miss Clavel. Although she is shown to have parents in one of the books and in the special Madeline's Christmas, she's depicted as an orphan in later episodes as well as in Madeline: Lost in Paris and the live-action film as her parents have passed away at some point. It's revealed that Madeline comes from an exceedingly wealthy family as she is to become the heir to her family's fortune, which was once at risk of being stolen by Madame LaCroque and Henri, a criminal duo who kidnaps young children and forces them to work at their underground lace factory.

Eleven Little Girls: Eleven classmates that accompany Madeline in her adventures and live in the same orphanage and boarding school as her. Their names are Anne, Chloe, Danielle, Ellie, Janine, Lulu, Monique, Nicole, Nona, Sylvie and Yvette. In the first few seasons and specials, only Chloe, Danielle, and Nicole had significant roles. By the third season, the other girls became more vocal and displayed their own individual personality. In "Madeline in Tahiti", Nona gets major role along with Chloe, Danielle, and Nicole in assisting Madeline during their vacation.

Miss Clavel: A nun that owns the orphanage/boarding school in which the girls live and is also their teacher. She has Catholic tendencies, as she and her students say grace before every meal.

Genevieve: Once a stray dog, now the school's pet. Madeline has more affection toward her, because she rescued her from drowning at River Seine.

Lord Cucuface: The administrator of a chain of orphanages and boarding schools. He maintains a close friendship with Miss Clavel.

Pepito: The son of the Spanish ambassador who lives next to the orphanage school. Despite being mean and aggressive to Madeline and the girls at first in "Madeline and the Bad Hat", they all soon become friends and he secretly develops a crush on Madeline.

Ambassador of Spain and his Wife: Pepito's parents who originate from their homeland of Spain.
  
Simon (voiced by Mark Hellman): The gardener in Madeline in London. He is very upset when he sees that Piccadilly ate all the plants he grew in the garden.

Dr. Cohn: A revered medic who often attends the little girls or Miss Clavel.

Mrs. Murphy: The housekeeper of the school/orphanage. She babysits the girls in case Miss Clavel needs to do business.

Lakshmi: A girl who traveled from India to stay in the orphanage/boarding school for a month. At first, the other girls believe she is an alien from outer space when they saw her communicating with a friend of hers from a CB radio, as the antennas on the radio made her look like a space martian, but they eventually come to find out that it wasn't the case. She has a fear of dogs after getting bitten by one when she was a lot younger; when she met Genevieve, she is afraid and doesn't want her to go near her, but after some time, Madeline tells Lakshmi that not all dogs are bad and that Genevieve is a good dog; she eventually overcomes her fear of dogs after letting Genevieve sniff and lick her hand.

Cast

Main 
 Marsha Moreau as Madeline (Specials), Lulu (Current)
 Tracey-Lee Smyth as Madeline (Season 1), Danielle (Season 2), Yvette (Current)
 Andrea Libman as Madeline (Seasons 2–3), (Current)
 Louise Vallance as Miss Clavel (Current) and Genevieve (Seasons 2–3)
 Kelly Sheridan as Danielle (Season 1-Current)
 Chantal Strand as Danielle (Season 3), Ellie (Current)
 Sonja Ball as Nicole (Specials), Nona (Current)
 Liz MacRae as Danielle (Specials), Anne (Current)
 Anik Matern as Chloe (Specials), Monique (Current)
 A.J. Bond as Pepito (Season 1)
 David Morse as Pepito (Season 2)
 Kyle Labine as Pepito (Season 3)
 Michael Heyward as Pepito (Season 3), (Current)
 Vanessa King as Chloe (Seasons 1–2), (Current)
 Veronika Sztopa as Nicole (Season 2), Chloe (Season 3), Sylvie (Current)
 Kristin Fairlie as Nicole (Season 1), Janine
 Britney Irvin as Nicole (Season 3), (Current)
 Ashleigh Ball as Danielle ("Madeline in Tahiti") and Nona ("Madeline in Tahiti")
 French Tickner as Lord Cucuface
 Christopher Plummer as the Narrator (Seasons 1–2)
 Christopher Gaze as the Narrator (Season 3)

Additional voices 

 Long John Baldry
 Kathleen Barr
 Nigel Bennett
 Susan Blu
 Jay Brazeau
 Jim Byrnes
 Garry Chalk
 Caroline Chan
 Brent Chapman
 Babz Chula
 Joely Collins
 Jennifer Copping
 Ian James Corlett
 Brenda Crichlow
 Deborah Demille
 Alex Doduk
 Michael Donovan
 Justin Escabedo
 Andrew Francis
 Merrilyn Gann
 Christopher Gaze
 MacKenzie Gray
 Adam Harrison
 Phil Hayes
 Kirosha Hemmings
 Paige Heuser
 Mark Hildreth
 Pam Hyatt
 Hailey Jenkins
 Andrew Kavadas
 Peter Kelamis
 Corrine Koslo
 Marilyn Lightstone
 Norma MacMillan
 Sam Mancuso
 Blu Mankuma
 Brenda McDonald
 Danny McKinnon
 Don McManus
 Scott McNeil
 Maxine Miller
 Chris Molineux
 Wezley Morris
 Kathy Morse
 Jane Mortifee
 Richard Newman
 Luke Palmer
 Jayne Paterson
 Taylor-Anne Reid
 Robert O. Smith
 Tabitha St. Germain
 Denis Thatcher
 Jane Thompson
 Kaitlin Turner
 Carolyn Tweedle
 Samuel Vincent
 Mark Weatherly
 Peter Wilds
 Alec Willows
 Dale Wilson

Television specials (1988–1991) 
In 1988, DIC Enterprises and Cinar (now part of WildBrain) adapted the first book into an animated television special for HBO. The screenplay was written by Judy Rothman, who was writer, lyricist and story editor for nearly all subsequent Madeline animated projects. The special was narrated by Christopher Plummer, and featured original music and songs by veteran Sesame Street songwriter and composer Joe Raposo with lyrics by Judy Rothman. The special was nominated for an Emmy Award for Outstanding Animated Program (One Hour or Less). In 1990, the special was released onto VHS by Hi-Tops Video.

Between 1990 and 1991, CINAR and France Animation produced animated adaptations of the other five original books for The Family Channel, with Christopher Plummer returning as the narrator and Marsha Moreau returning to voice Madeline. Each special featured new songs, with lyrics by Rothman and music by Jeffrey Zahn, who replaced Raposo after his death in 1989. "I'm Madeline", Madeline's theme song from the original special, was reprised. The specials were released on video by Golden Book Video.

Television series (1993–2001) 
In 1993, DIC produced a Madeline television series, which also aired on The Family Channel. Twenty episodes were produced for the first series. Christopher Plummer reprised his role as narrator again and "I'm Madeline" was the series' theme song, but most of the voice actors were replaced. The series was rerun on Disney Channel, Playhouse Disney and Toon Disney in the U.S. It features new songs with music by Andy Street (who replaced Jeffrey Zahn) and lyrics by Rothman, but compared to the previous TV specials, the first series onwards would only feature one song per episode in addition to the aforementioned theme songs.

In 1995, an additional 13 episodes were produced by DIC for ABC under the title The New Adventures of Madeline. A new theme song, called "Hats Off to Madeline", was used as the new opening theme, with the music by Andy Street with lyrics by Judy Rothman, although some early airings of those episodes however featured "I'm Madeline" but sung by the new voice cast. The new voice cast included Andrea Libman as the title character, S. Louise Vallance as both Miss Clavel and Genevieve, and David Morse from Maple Ridge, Canada as Pepito.

Between 2000 and 2001, DIC produced 26 episodes for Disney Channel. "Hats off to Madeline" was re-sung by the cast and was used as the intro theme again (the Lions Gate VHS's and DVDs from 2001, alongside both Sing-a-Longs, had a different song titled "Our Madeline"). Christopher Gaze took over from Christopher Plummer as narrator. The show won a Daytime Emmy Award for Outstanding Children's Animated Program.

Madeline was shown on KOL Secret Slumber Party on CBS between Fall 2006 and 2007.

Broadcast and home video rights to all of the DIC/CINAR Madeline episodes/specials/telefilm/direct-to-video film are owned by WildBrain, as of September 2019.

The series aired on Qubo from October 6, 2018 to February 22, 2021.

Madeline was exclusive on Sprout on its On Demand section from 2015 to 2017 when the channel was rebranded to Universal Kids.

Episodes

Season 1 (1993–1994)

Season 2 (1995)

Season 3 (2000–2001)

Films (1999–2005)

Madeline: Lost in Paris (1999) 

On August 3, 1999, Buena Vista Home Video through Walt Disney Home Video released the feature-length movie Madeline: Lost in Paris, featuring Madeline being drawn into a scam by her supposed "Uncle" Horst and finding the true meaning to the word "family". As with Season 2 and eventually Season 3 of the series, Andrea Libman reprised her role as Madeline.

The movie was later released on DVD on April 3, 2010, by Shout! Factory.

My Fair Madeline (2002) 
As part of the DIC Movie Toons series of Television films, DIC produced My Fair Madeline, where Madeline is falsely accused of misbehavior on a trip to the Louvre and is sent to a London Finishing School, while attempting to foil the plot of two thieves. The voice cast was almost entirely replaced for the movie, with  Chantal Strand voicing Madeline and most notably featuring Whoopi Goldberg as Miss Clavel. Coincidentally, Goldberg played Deloris Van Cartier in Sister Act. Deloris is a nun while Miss Clavel is coincidentally a nun as well.

The movie was originally aired on November 17, 2002, on Nickelodeon and was later released onto VHS and DVD by MGM Home Entertainment followed on with international airings on Disney Channel, Toon Disney and Playhouse Disney.

Madeline in Tahiti (2005) 
In 2005, DIC produced another film, titled Madeline in Tahiti, which is the final Madeline production to have been created. The movie features Madeline and her friends going on a vacation to Tahiti to stop Miss Clavel from retiring, with Pepito sneaking along, as well as stopping a villainous plot to erupt the Tahiti-nui volcano. Chantal Strand reprised her role as Madeline while other characters were recast or reprised their roles from My Fair Madeline.

The film was originally going to be released on DVD in the United States by Walt Disney Home Entertainment in 2006, but this release never saw the light of day. It was, however, released on DVD in some regions in 2007 through other distributors, and was eventually released in the United States on iTunes and Amazon Video in 2015 and YouTube in 2020.

Sing-a-Longs 
In 2001, DIC produced two direct-to-video releases which featured songs and clips from Season 3 of the series akin to Disney's Sing-Along Songs series, which were titled Sing-a-Long with Madeline and her Friends and Sing-a-Long Around the World with Madeline.

They were originally released by Lions Gate Home Entertainment and Trimark Home Video on September 25, 2001, and March 25, 2002, respectively, and later reissued together by Mill Creek Entertainment as Madeline's Merry Musical Melodies on September 10, 2013, as well as being available for digital download.

Home media releases 
The 1993 series was originally released by Golden Book Video on all single VHS volumes, and Sony Wonder on both VHS and DVD. The DVD versions contained 2 episodes each, sometimes with the original specials.

The 2000 series was released by Lions Gate Home Entertainment and Trimark Home Video in 2001 and 2002 on all VHS and DVD sets.

In 2008, 20th Century Fox Home Entertainment released 2 DVDs titled "Next Stop, America" and "Meet Me in Paris", each containing 3 episodes.

In 2010, Shout! Factory released 5 single-disc collections of the series.

In September 2013, Mill Creek Entertainment released 3 single disc collections featuring content from the animated series as well as the original TV specials. The New Adventures of Madeline- Adventures in Paris contains 6 episodes from the 2000 series, while Madeline's Merry Musical Melodies features various musical interludes from the animated series. Bonjour Madeline contains all 6 original TV specials. Later in May 2014, Mill Creek re-released the three single disc collections together in one three-pack set, followed by Madeline: The Complete Collection on DVD in Region 1 for the first time in August 2015. This six-disc collection features all six original specials produced by DIC Entertainment and CINAR between 1988 and 1991, as well as all 59 episodes from the Madeline TV series (1993, 1995, 2000–2001).

Notes

References

External links 
 
 

British animated television series
1993 American television series debuts
2001 American television series endings
1990s American animated television series
2000s American animated television series
1993 Canadian television series debuts
2001 Canadian television series endings
1990s Canadian animated television series
2000s Canadian animated television series
1993 French television series debuts
2001 French television series endings
1990s French animated television series
2000s French animated television series
American children's animated adventure television series
American children's animated musical television series
American television shows based on children's books
Canadian children's animated adventure television series
Canadian children's animated musical television series
Canadian television shows based on children's books
French children's animated adventure television series
French children's animated musical television series
French television shows based on children's books
Television series by DIC Entertainment
Television series by Cookie Jar Entertainment
Television series by DHX Media
Daytime Emmy Award for Outstanding Animated Program winners
Disney Channel original programming
Animated television series about orphans
Television shows set in Paris
English-language television shows